Barca or Barce may refer to:

Places 

Barca (ancient city) or Barce, a Greek city in North Africa
La Barca (municipality), Jalisco, Mexico
Barqa, Gaza
Barca (parish), a parish of Portugal
Bârca, a commune in Dolj County, Romania
Košice-Barca, a city part of Košice, Slovakia
Barca, Rimavská Sobota District, a village in southern Slovakia
Barca, Soria, a municipality in Soria, autonomous community of Castile and León, Spain
A Barca, an abandoned hamlet in Galicia, Spain

Zoology 
Barce (bug), a genus of thread-legged bugs in the family Reduviidae
Barca (butterfly), a genus of skippers in the family Hesperiidae

Other uses 

"Barça" or FC Barcelona, a sports club in Barcelona, Spain
UB-Barça, a now-defunct Spanish basketball team once sponsored by FC Barcelona
Barca (board game), a strategy board game
Barca-longa, a two or three-masted lugger used in the Mediterranean

People with the surname 

Barcids or Barca family, a prominent family in ancient Carthage
Hamilcar Barca (275–228 BC), general and statesman, father of Hannibal, Hasdrubal, and Mago
Hannibal Barca (247 – c. 181 BC), military commander
Hasdrubal Barca (245–207 BC), military commander
Mago Barca (243–203 BC), military commander
Aija Barča (born 1949), Latvian pedagogue and politician
Fabrizio Barca (born 1954), Italian politician
Giovanni Battista Barca (1594–1650), Italian Baroque painter
Mike Barca (born 1954), American soccer goalkeeper
Peter W. Barca (born 1955), Democratic politician from the U.S. state of Wisconsin
Roxana Bârcă (born 1988), Romanian long-distance runner
Teodor Bârcă (fl. 1894–1918), Bessarabian politician
Teodosie Bârcă (fl. 1894–1918), Bessarabian politician
Vasile Bârcă (1884–1949), Moldovan politician

See also 

Abantiades barcas, a moth of the family Hepialidae
Barco (disambiguation)
Barqa or Cyrenaica
Burka (disambiguation)
Marj, Libya, modern city on the site of ancient Barca